Luca Jannis Kilian (born 1 September 1999) is a German professional footballer who plays as a defender for Bundesliga club 1. FC Köln.

Club career
Kilian joined the youth academy of Borussia Dortmund at the age of 11 from his local club Hombruch. On 24 May 2019, he signed a professional contract with SC Paderborn 07. He made his professional debut with Paderbon in a 3–2 Bundesliga loss to FC Bayern Munich on 28 September 2019.

On 10 August 2020, Kilian signed for Bundesliga club Mainz 05, on a four-year deal. On 24 August 2021, it was announced that Kilian would join 1. FC Köln on a one-year loan. He joined the club on a permanent basis for a fee of €2 Million in July 2022. He signed a contract until 2025.

Personal life
Kilian is the grandson of the German former footballer Amand Theis. On 13 March 2020, Kilian tested positive for coronavirus.

References

External links

Bundesliga Profile

1999 births
Living people
German footballers
Footballers from Dortmund
Association football defenders
Germany under-21 international footballers
Germany youth international footballers
Bundesliga players
Regionalliga players
SC Paderborn 07 players
Borussia Dortmund II players
1. FSV Mainz 05 players
1. FC Köln players